Rani Manjula Devi was an Indian politician, daughter of the Maharajah of Pithapuram. She was elected to the Lok Sabha, lower house of the Parliament of India from Goalpara, Assam as a member of the Indian National Congress. She was a student of the Church Park Convent in Madras. She married the Raja of Sidhli Raja Ajit Narayan dev in 1932.

References

External links
 Official biographical sketch in Parliament of India website

Indian National Congress politicians
India MPs 1957–1962
1912 births
Lok Sabha members from Assam
Year of death missing